Araratyan or in Western Armenian Araradian is an Armenian surname. Notable people with the surname include:

Sargis Araratyan (1886–1943), Armenian politician
Khachatur Araratian (1876–1937), Russian army officer

See also
Araratov

Armenian-language surnames